Yevgeni Bodrov (born January 8, 1988) is a Russian professional ice hockey player. He is currently an unrestricted free agent who most recently played for the Severstal Cherepovets in the Kontinental Hockey League (KHL).

After five seasons with Ak Bars Kazan, Bodrov was traded during the 2014–15 season, to Atlant Moscow Oblast in exchange for Mikhail Glukhov on November 20, 2014.

Career statistics

Regular season and playoffs

International

References

External links

1988 births
Living people
Ak Bars Kazan players
Atlant Moscow Oblast players
HC Lada Togliatti players
Sportspeople from Tolyatti
Russian ice hockey centres
Salavat Yulaev Ufa players
Severstal Cherepovets players
HC Sibir Novosibirsk players
HC Spartak Moscow players